Mackay-Bennett Seamount, also known as Mackay-Bennett Knoll, is an undersea mountain in the North Atlantic Ocean, located about  southeast of Cape Race in Canadian waters off Atlantic Canada.

Mackay-Bennett Seamount is one of the seven named Fogo Seamounts. Its name is derived from CS Mackay-Bennett, a British cable ship that recovered deceased bodies from the Titanic disaster in 1912. Perhaps the best-known victim she recovered was The Unknown Child, a 19-month-old third class passenger who was later identified as Sidney Leslie Goodwin.

References

External links

Fogo Seamounts